Bakhabi is a village in Ad Dhahirah Region, in northeastern Oman. It lies along Highway 21 opposite Abu Silah, north of Mazim.

References

Populated places in Ad Dhahirah North Governorate